"Bring Down the Moon" is a song written and performed by American duo Boy Meets Girl and released as a single from the album Reel Life. It reached #49 on the Billboard Hot 100 and #92 on the UK Singles Chart.

Music video 
The music video was directed by Alex Proyas.

Credits 
 Shannon Rubicam – lead vocals, backing vocals
 George Merrill – lead vocals, acoustic piano, synthesizers, E-mu Emax
 Joe Mardin – synthesizers
 John Goux – guitars, EBow
 Leon Gaer – bass
 Denny Fongheiser – Linn 9000 drum machine
 Michael Jochum – drum overdubs

References 

1989 singles
Songs written by Shannon Rubicam
Songs written by George Merrill (songwriter)
Boy Meets Girl (band) songs
1988 songs